Yana Uqsha (Quechua yana black, very dark, uqsha (locally), uqsa high altitude grass, also spelled Yana Ucsha) is a  mountain in the Andes of Peru, about  high. It is situated in the Ayacucho Region, Huanca Sancos Province, on the border of the districts of Lucanamarca and Sancos. Yana Uqsha lies south of Yanawaqra and Yuraq Urqu.

References

Mountains of Peru
Mountains of Ayacucho Region